André Ferrand (born 22 February 1936) is a French politician and a member of the Senate of France. He is a member of the Union for a Popular Movement Party.

References
Page on the Senate website

1936 births
Living people
French Senators of the Fifth Republic
Emlyon Business School alumni
Union for a Popular Movement politicians
Politicians from Lyon
Senators of French citizens living abroad